Occupational crime is crime that is committed through opportunity created in the course of legal occupation.  Thefts of company property, vandalism, the misuse of information and many other activities come under the rubric of occupational crime. The concept of occupational crime - as one of the principal forms of white collar crime - has been quite familiar and widely invoked since the publication of Clinard and Quinney's influential Criminal Behavior Systems: A Typology. More recently, however, the term occupational crime has been applied to activities quite removed from the original meaning of white collar crime, and it has been used interchangeably with such terms as occupational deviance and workplace crime. In the interest of greater conceptual clarity within the field of white collar crime the argument is made here for restricting the term 'occupational crime' to illegal and unethical activities committed for individual financial gain - or to avoid financial loss - in the context of a legitimate occupation. The term 'occupational deviance' is better reserved for deviation from occupational norms (e.g. drinking on the job; sexual harassment), and the term 'workplace crime' is better reserved for conventional forms of crime committed in the workplace (e.g. rape; assault). The conceptual conflation of fundamentally dissimilar activities hinders theoretical, empirical, and policy-related progress in the field of white collar crime studies.

Crimes